General elections are scheduled to be held in Ecuador in 2025. Incumbent president Guillermo Lasso is eligible for a second term.

Electoral system 
The president is elected using a modified two-round system, with a candidate required to get over 50% of the vote, or get over 40% of the vote and be 10% ahead of their nearest rival to be elected in the first round. The president is limited to two consecutive four-year terms.

Members of the National Assembly are elected by three methods. Fifteen are elected by closed list proportional representation in a nationwide constituency. Six are elected by overseas voters (two each from Canada/United States, Latin America and Asia/Europe/Oceania). The remaining 116 members are elected from multi-member constituencies by closed list proportional representation, with all seats allocated using the Webster method. Members of the National Assembly are limited to two four-year terms, either consecutive or not. There are gender quotas for the party lists, meaning there is alternation between men and women. There are no quotas for minority representation.

Presidential candidates

Publicly expressed interest 

Guillermo Lasso, current president of Ecuador and founder of CREO.
Carlos Rabascall, former vice presidential candidate and member of Union for Hope.
Yaku Pérez, former presidential candidate and former Provincial Prefect of Azuay Province.
Pedro Freile, former presidential candidate, Director of the Inter-American Development Bank Ecuador Division (2004-2005) and leader of Amigo movement.

Notes

References 

Elections in Ecuador